The Paskuhan is the culmination of the university wide Christmas activities of the University of Santo Tomas in Manila, Philippines. The annual tradition started in 1991. The programs of Paskuhan were held during the last week or last day before the Christmas break of the university. In 2014, however, because of the change in the academic calendar of the university, it was scheduled in the Feast of the Immaculate Conception on December 8, 2014. It was later rescheduled to December 11, 2014, because of Typhoon Ruby.

Event
One of the highlights of the celebration is the Panunuluyan or the re-enactment of the Virgin Mary and St. Joseph's search for a place for Mary to give birth to Jesus Christ. The Paskuhan Mass comes shortly after and is usually presided by the university rector. Current students and university employees are also treated in the Agape or the campus-wide banquet. The Agape in Paskuhan started in 2011, following the Agape of the Quadricentennial Celebration.

In some editions of the Paskuhan, the celebration started with a festive parade from the different faculties and colleges.

History

Beginnings
The first Christmas celebration in the university was held on December 19, 1991, with the theme, “Paskong Tomasino, Paskong Filipino ’91.” It featured a Holy Mass, held in the UST Grandstand, the Panunuluyan, which was participated by the different faculties and colleges, and an inter-collegiate lantern-making contest. A 14-foot Christmas tree was also erected at the UST Grandstand where students placed their donations for the victims of the Mount Pinatubo eruption and Tropical Storm Uring (International name: Thelma) in Ormoc City.

It was in 1993 that the celebration was formally named as Paskuhan. The celebration was a simple gathering spearheaded by the then UST Treasurer Fr. Tereso Campillo, O.P.

A more festive Paskuhan was held in 1994 to celebrate the upcoming World Youth Day in January 1995. It featured for the first time the 80-foot Christmas tree, which was first designed by UST College of Architecture and Fine Arts professor Rey Mañago.

Succeeding years
In 2004, funds for the celebration were donated to the victims of the 4 typhoons that struck the country.

Present day (2009-present)
In 2009, the Paskuhan was entitled as, 4 horas, 4 dias, 4 hundred days, 400 years to coincide with the university's countdown programs of the Quadricentennial Year. The celebration began at 8:00 p.m. of December 18, until 12:00am of December 19, which was 4 days before December 22, exactly 400 days before January 28, 2011.

The Paskuhan Mass in 2012 was celebrated by the Very Rev. Bruno Cadoré, O.P., the Master of the Order of Preachers and chancellor of the university. Rev. Fr. Herminio Dagohoy, O.P., the university rector, served as the homilist.

In 2013, the celebration served for a cause as mass offerings were donated to the victims of Super Typhoon Yolanda (International name: Haiyan).

In 2014, the Paskuhan festivities were moved from December 8 to December 11 because of Typhoon Ruby (International name: Hagupit). The forthcoming visit of Pope Francis to the university in January 2015 became the main theme of the celebration.

The programs in the 2015 edition were likewise modified because of the Typhoon Nona (International name: Melor). The Mass was moved to the Quadricentennial Pavilion and the concert was held at the UST Practice Gym.

The festivities returned in-person in 2022 after 2 years of holding it virtually. The month-long celebration began on December 2, 2022, with the staging of the Christmas Concert at Plaza Mayor, opening of the campus lights, and Agape.

Themes

Light displays
Pyrotechnic display has always culminated the celebration. Since 2011, pyromusical has become part of the program. 
Projection mapping was incorporated in 2015, where the UST Main Building was used as the surface.

Recent celebration with no firework display
 2004
 2013

References

Paskuhan
Christmas in the Philippines
Events in Metro Manila